Carex ramosii is a tussock-forming perennial in the family Cyperaceae. It is native to parts of the Philippines.

See also
 List of Carex species

References

ramosii
Plants described in 1910
Taxa named by Georg Kükenthal
Flora of the Philippines